Trollhättan is the 23rd-largest city in Sweden, the seat of Trollhättan Municipality, Västra Götaland County. It is situated by Göta älv, near the lake Vänern, and has a population of approximately 50,000 in the city proper. It is located 75 km (46 mi) north of Sweden's second-largest city, Gothenburg.

History
Trollhättan was granted city rights (which today have no legal effect) in 1916 at 
which time it had about 15,000 inhabitants, now grown to 59,058.
Trollhättan was founded on the river Göta älv, at the Trollhättan Falls. The site was first mentioned in literature from 1413.
Trollhättan had a strategic significance on the road between Västergötland and Norway. It was also of a commercial and political significance for shipping to and from Vänern.

Utilization of the river falls was the first important business activity in the area. From the Middle Ages milling and sawing operations have been conducted where the city center is now located. For centuries, Trollhättan Falls was an obstacle for boats travelling the river, until a lock system was completed in the 19th century. In 1795 the English writer Mary Wollstonecraft visited Trollhattan on her trip through Sweden, Norway and Denmark. She described in one of her letters her observations of the canal under construction, and the falls. It has since been updated several times, and the present locks were finished in 1916. In the late 19th century, hydropower was developed in Trollhättan. The Swedish energy corporation Vattenfall  took its name from the falls in Trollhättan. Today the city has two operational hydropower stations, Olidan and Hojum.

Name

The name Trollhättan itself was originally used only for the falls area.  The name Trollhättan is translated as "troll's bonnet". The latter part "hätta" could also mean mountain top. The water that splashed from a large rock at the bottom of the waterfall (before the hydro dam was built) was imagined to look like a troll's hat.
Other former names of the site are Eiðar and Stora Edet; the latter lives on in the name of the south-bordering municipality of Lilla Edet.

Industry
The manufacturing company Nydqvist & Holm AB  (now NOHAB) was based in the city of Trollhättan dating from 1847. Further industries quickly followed. Dating from the 19th century, Trollhättan formerly housed the headquarters and main production plant of Saab Automobile and now houses the headquarters and a production plant of National Electric Vehicle Sweden (NEVS). It also has a number of industrial facilities, headed by GKN Aerospace (previously known as Volvo Aero) and its contractual suppliers. As with parallel locations elsewhere in Europe, much of its production has moved from heavy industry to professional services and the creation of intellectual property.

As of 2011 Trollhättan hosts a film production complex known as Trollywood; movies shot there include Show Me Love (Fucking Åmål), Dancer in the Dark, Melancholia, Dogville and studio scenes for Lilya 4-ever. The movie studio Film i Väst centered here produces about half of the Swedish feature-length films.

Trollhätte Canal
During the 17th century, work on a system of locks began and the first lock was completed around 1607 at Lilla Edet. During the 18th century several unsuccessful attempts were made to complete the locks. In 1718 a contract was signed by the government and Christopher Polhem (1661–1751) for construction of a canal between Kattegatt and Lake Vänern and from Vättern to the Baltic Sea. Trollhätte Canal  first begun construction in 1718. In 1800, Baltzar von Platen (1766–1829) completed the locks. Larger locks were later built under Nils Ericson (1802–1870). The further construction of the Göta Canal enabled larger boats to pass through Trollhätte Canal.

Trollhättan Church
Trollhättan Church (Trollhättans Kyrka) belongs to the Trollhättan congregation in the Diocese of Skara. Between 1860 and 1862, the New Trollhätte Canal Company  (Nya Trollhätte Kanalbolag) built Trollhättan church. It was inauguration in 1862 and was handed over to the congregation as a gift. The church is erected in a neo-Gothic style after drawings by architect Adolf W. Edelsvärd (1824–1919). It consists of a longhouse with a north–south orientation. To the south is the tower with main entrance and to the north there is a polygonal cairn. It is located on a cliff in the Göta River in the middle of the canal system.
 
At the expense of the  canal  company, a sacristy was built in the north-west in 1896–1897 with a rise to the pulpit, and the same year came glass paintings designed by Folke Zettervall (1862–1955). The window paintings in the choir, which was installed in 1962, are done by artist Ralph Bergholtz (1908-1988).  The church was restored in 1983–84 with Jerk Alton as architect.

Sports
Trollhättan hosted Division B of the 2017 Bandy World Championship.
The following sports clubs are located in Trollhättan:
 IFK Trollhättan
 FC Trollhättan
 Skoftebyns IF
 Gripen Trollhättan BK

Gallery

See also
Olidan Hydroelectric Power Station
Saab Car Museum
University College West

References

External links

Trollhättan City Website in English
Visit Trollhättan Vänersborg

 
Municipal seats of Västra Götaland County
Swedish municipal seats
Populated places in Västra Götaland County
Populated places in Trollhättan Municipality

Cities in Västra Götaland County

nn:Trollhättans kommun